Range Law is a 1931 American pre-Code Western film directed by Phil Rosen and starring Ken Maynard. It was produced and distributed by Tiffany Pictures. A print is preserved in the Library of Congress collection.

Cast
 Ken Maynard - Hap Connors
 Frances Dade - Ruth Warren
 Frank Mayo - Jim Blont
 Aileen Manning - Ruth's Attendant
 Jack Rockwell - The Sheriff
 Lafe McKee - Old Frisco
 Charles King - Bull Legal
 Tom London - Henchman Cleve
 Tarzan - Himself, Ken's Horse
Ralph Bucko - Posse Rider
Roy Bucko - Posse Rider
Bob Burns - Townsman
Robert Dudley - Minister
Bud McClure - Posse Rider
Blackjack Ward - Henchman Jack

Plot
Imprisoned for a crime he did not commit, Connors escapes to try find the culprit who framed him. He takes a job at a ranch whose owner (Warren), is engaged to the actual villain (Blont). Connors is arrested by the sheriff but escapes again. He eventually is vindicated, and his relationship with Warren is restored.

References

External links
 Range Law at IMDb.com

1931 films
Tiffany Pictures films
Films directed by Phil Rosen
1931 Western (genre) films
American Western (genre) films
American black-and-white films
1930s American films